Coccinea may refer to:
 the plant genus Coccinia, the scarlet gourds
 the plant section Coccinea is the name of a species derivative to many plants, example Banksia sect. Coccinea, Banksia coccinea